Quyen Tran  is an Vietnamese-American cinematographer based in Los Angeles. She has worked on multiple Sundance films such as The Little Hours and Deidra & Laney Rob a Train.

Education 

After witnessing the 9/11 attacks in New York City, Tran applied to film school and was accepted to UCLA. Roger Deakins was a cinematographer-in-residence at the time of her attendance and became one of her mentors.

Photography 

Tran began her artistic career as a still photographer. Her photos have appeared in the New York Times, LA Times, USA Today, New York Post, New York Daily News, Dateline NBC, HBO’s In Memoriam, BBC, CNN International News, PBS, Sacramento Bee, The Age (Australia), Scientific American, Variety, TV Guide, and more. She was nominated for the World Press Photo Award.

Film and Television 
Tran has worked as a cinematographer on short films, television, and full length films. In 2021, Tran became a member of the American Society of Cinematographers.

Awards and honors 

 Best Cinematography UCLA Spotlight: 2008, 2007, 2006
 Best Feature Cinematography – Wild Rose Film Festival
 Federico de Laurentiis Memorial Scholarship
 National Theater Goers Alliance Scholarship

Personal life 

Tran's parents were refugees from South Vietnam. She is bilingual, fluent in English and Vietnamese. Tran is Catholic. She is married to voice actor Sam Riegel and they have two children.

Filmography 

{| class="wikitable sortable"
|+ Feature films and TV movies
!Year
!Title
!Director
!Notes
|-
| 2020
| Life in a Year
| Mitja Okorn
|
|-
| 2020
| Palm Springs
| Max Barbakow
|
|-
| 2016
| The Night Stalker
| Megan Griffiths
|
|-
| 2018
| Dark Was the Night (formerly Behold My Heart)
| Joshua Leonard
|
|-
| 2017
| The Little Hours
| Jeff Baena
|
|-
| 2017
| Deidra & Laney Rob A Train
| Sydney Freeland
|
|-
| 2015
| Pali Road
| Jonathan Lim
|
|-
| 2015
| Off the Menu: Asian America
| Grace Lee
|
|-
| 2016
| To The Moon & Back
| Susan Morgan Cooper
|
|-
| 2015
| The Automatic Hate
| Justin Lerner
|
|-
| 2013
| American Revolutionary: The Evolution of Grace Lee Boggs
| Grace Lee
|2014 Peabody Award
|-
| 2013
| Free Ride
| Shana Sosin
|
|-
| 2011
| Mulberry Child
| Susan Morgan Cooper
|
|-
| 2010
| Troublemaker
| Geeta Malik
|
|-
| 2010
| Girlfriend
| Justin Lerner
|
|-
| 2011
| A Bag of Hammers
| Brian Crano
|
|-
| 2009
| The People I've Slept With<ref>{{Cite news |last=Catsoulis |first=Jeannette |date=12 August 2010 |title=Tales of a Trashy Bachelorette [Movie Review: 'The People I've Slept With |work=The New York Times |url=https://www.nytimes.com/2010/08/13/movies/13peopl.html |url-status=live |url-access=subscription |access-date=1 February 2019 |archive-url=https://web.archive.org/web/20230129100807/https://www.nytimes.com/2010/08/13/movies/13peopl.html |archive-date=29 January 2023 |issn=0362-4331}}</ref>
| Quentin Lee
|
|-
| 2009
| 16 to Life| Becky Smith
|
|-
| 2008
| Vietnam Overtures| Stephane Gauger
|
|-
|
| Kingship| Julien Favre
|
|}

 Article mentions and interviews Between the Sheets: Quyen Tran, Critical Role interview with Brian W. Foster

#belowthelinesowhite? Hollywood’s Rank & File Leaders Tackle DiversityFour Asian-American Women Share Their Experiences Working in Hollywood, by Peter CaranicasHow 'The Little Hours' DP Used 'Crazy Rigs' to Recreate Film School on an Unpredictable Set, by Hawkins DuBois“How to Sell the Outrageous Premise of the Film”: DP Quyen Tran on Deidra & Laney Rob a Train, by Filmmaker StaffInternational Women’s Day: 17 female cinematographers to celebrate, by Nikki BaughmanInterview: Cinematographer Quyen Tran on the Minute Details of Filming “The Little Hours," by Stephen SaitoMotion picture academy invites largest class ever in continued push for diversity, by Josh RottenbergSundance 2017 Q+A — Cinematographer Quyen Tran, by David Alexander WillisQuyen Tran on Shooting Frankie Shaw’s Sundance-Winning SMILF,'' by Scott Macaulay

References

External links 

 

American women cinematographers
American cinematographers
21st-century American photographers
Place of birth missing (living people)
Year of birth missing (living people)
Photographers from California
People from Los Angeles
American artists of Vietnamese descent
American people of Vietnamese descent
Living people
21st-century American women photographers